St. Stephen's Episcopal School of Houston, founded in 1971, is a small private school located in Houston, Texas. The educational intentions of the school targeted younger students; the school currently admits children from the age of fifteen months to the age of fourteen years (15 months to 8th grade).

The school is associated with the St. Stephen's Episcopal Church, which incorporates a weekly church service into the students' agenda.

The school previously had a senior high school section.

Lower school
The lower school of St. Stephen's ranges from fifteen months, the orientation program, to twelve years, upper elementary.

Middle school
The St. Stephen's Middle School was established in 1991.

The middle school curriculum includes computer skills, creative and factual writing, fine arts, language arts, mathematics, physical fitness, science, social studies, and Spanish.

Trips
During the school year, classes ranging from 1st grade to 8th grade, through school funding, take trips to different parts of the country. Grades first through sixth, on different occasions, go to Camp Allen for a three-day period. In addition, fourth, fifth and sixth graders go to The Outdoor School for four days.
During the two-year program, the middle school (seventh and eighth graders) go to Mo Ranch, Belize, and Washington D.C. for a five- to six-day period.

In addition, St. Stephen's students take field trips to Jones Hall and other music venues in Houston, Texas. Public transportation is usually utilized on these field trips, to preserve the environment.

See also

 Montessori method
 Camp Champions
 Camp Allen
 Mo Ranch
 Christianity in Houston

References

External links
 St. Stephen's Episcopal School Houston's Website
 St. Stephen's Episcopal School Houston's Website (A.K.A.: Edline) Also known as ParentNet

High schools in Harris County, Texas
Private K–8 schools in Houston
Private K-12 schools in Houston
Christian schools in Houston
Montessori schools in the United States
Episcopal Church in Texas
Episcopal schools in the United States
Neartown, Houston